Alexander Petersen Jr. (July 20, 1924 – June 23, 2014) was an American football coach, basketball coach and basketball player. He played basketball at Oregon State University, and while studying for his doctorate at Columbia University, he played a little basketball in the American League and the Eastern Basketball League of Connecticut. He returned to Oregon after finishing his doctorate. He was served as the head football coach at Southern Oregon College of Education—now known as Southern Oregon University—in Ashland, Oregon for three seasons, from 1952 to 1954.  His record at Southern Oregon was 8–14.

Head coaching record

Football

References

1924 births
2014 deaths
American men's basketball players
Bridgeport Roesslers players
Oregon State Beavers men's basketball players
Southern Oregon Raiders football coaches
Southern Oregon Raiders men's basketball coaches
Scranton Miners (basketball) players
People from Coquille, Oregon